The 2019 Sham Shui Po District Council election was held on 24 November 2019 to elect all 25 members to the Sham Shui Po District Council.

Amid the massive pro-democracy protests, the pro-democrats scored a historic landslide victory by taking 22 of the 25 seats. The ADPL retained the status of the largest party, securing 11 seats in total.

Overall election results
Before election:

Change in composition:

References

External links
 Election Results - Overall Results

2019 Hong Kong local elections